The Bowstring Murders is a mystery novel by the American writer John Dickson Carr (1906–1977), who wrote it under the name of Carr Dickson. It is a whodunit and also his only novel with the alcoholic detective John Gaunt.

The Bowstring Murders is the only one of his many works to be published under the name Carr Dickson; subsequent reprints have been under his main pseudonym of "Carter Dickson".

Plot summary
Elderly eccentric Lord Rayle has a priceless collection of medieval arms and armour housed at Bowstring Castle. When he is found strangled by one of his own bowstrings, it is up to John Gaunt to solve the crime.

1933 British novels
Novels by John Dickson Carr
Works published under a pseudonym
William Morrow and Company books